The Rodeo–Chediski Fire was a wildfire that burned in east-central Arizona beginning on June 18, 2002, and was not controlled until July 7. It was the worst forest fire in Arizona's recorded history until June 14, 2011 when the Wallow Fire surpassed it.  Several local communities, including Show Low, Pinetop-Lakeside, Heber-Overgaard Clay Springs and Pinedale, were threatened and had to be evacuated.

Origin and development
Initially there were two separate fires. The first fire, the Rodeo, was reported on the afternoon of June 18 near the Rodeo Fairgrounds on the Fort Apache Indian Reservation by Cibecue. An arsonist was arrested on June 29 and was later charged.

The Chediski Fire was first reported on the morning of June 20 near Chediski Peak east of Payson. It had been started by a stranded quad rider, Valinda Jo Elliott, trying to signal a news helicopter.

Around 8,000 people were evacuated; by the end of the fire, around 30,000 people would be moved. The two burning areas approached through crosswinds over June 21 and June 22 as a further 11,000 people were ordered to leave their homes. The fire's progress slowed after the two merged and by June 26 the fire was 5% contained by backburning, line building, and aerial retardant drops – protecting the settlements of Clay Springs, Linden and Pinedale, but  had burned. The fire was 28% contained by June 28, but it was not fully under control until July 7 at a cost of $43.1 million. About 400 homes were destroyed in Pinedale and other small communities. The fire was declared a disaster area. RodeoFire.com was established at the fire's onset as a portal for concerned citizens and family members acting as an event update website.

Aftermath

Restoration

Of the woodlands affected,  (60.0%) was part of the Fort Apache Indian Reservation. Of the rest,  (35.7%) was in the Apache–Sitgreaves National Forests and  (2.3%) in the Tonto National Forest. The remaining destruction occurred on private land. The fire damaged or destroyed ecosystem resources, disrupted hydrologic functioning, and altered the loadings of flammable fuels on much of the ponderosa pine forest that was exposed to the burn.

After the fire, efforts were made to stabilize the landscape by burned area emergency response teams.

Political consequences

Political figures, including Senator Jon Kyl of Arizona, blamed the fire on "radical environmentalists" and their opposition to logging to thin the forests. The group, Sierra Club, responded by saying they have long supported the thinning of underbrush and small trees through controlled burns, not the logging of large trees. But this fire, among other devastating drought-year fires in the American West, helped propel new forest management laws, enacted by both the U.S. Congress and local authorities. Of these the most notable is the Healthy Forests Restoration Act, which President George W. Bush signed into law in 2003. Although these policies presented high-profile, short-term solutions, the ecological effects of these policies are hotly debated among forestry experts.

Legal actions

The arsonist, who received a 10-year prison sentence in March 2004, was Leonard Gregg, a Cibecue resident who worked as a seasonal firefighter for the tribal fire department. He told investigators he had set two fires that morning (the first was quickly put out) in hopes of getting hired by the federal Bureau of Indian Affairs for a quick-response fire crew. Gregg had previously worked as a BIA fire crew member, and was indeed among the first to be called in to fight the Rodeo Fire.

The stranded motorist, Valinda Jo Elliott, who started the Chediski portion of the fire was not charged with arson by the US Attorney's office, much to the anger of local residents and the tribe. In 2009, a judge ruled that she is eligible to be tried in a civil suit in the White Mountain Apache tribal court.  In 2014 the court ruled that she was liable for $1650 in civil penalties and $57,000,000 in restitution to the tribe.

See also
 Hayman Fire of 2002, a concurrent large wildfire in Colorado

References

External links
 
 Chediski-Rodeo Fire map –

2002 wildfires in the United States
2002 in Arizona
Apache-Sitgreaves National Forests
Arson in Arizona
Tonto National Forest
Wildfires in Arizona